The women's 10,000 metres at the World Athletics Championships was held at the Khalifa International Stadium in Doha, Qatar, on 28 September 2019.

Summary
At the beginning, none of the favorites wanted to lead the race, so leading duties fell on Alina Reh to keep the pace honest, 9:29.69 for the 3000 metres.  A lap later, #3 Kenyan Rosemary Wanjiru accelerated.  The field strung out.  Her teammates Hellen Obiri and Agnes Tirop followed.  If it was a sacrificial tactic, the Ethiopian team took the bait.  Letesenbet Gidey, Netsanet Gudeta and Senbere Teferi came forward in chase of the breakaway.  The only other athlete to join the lead group was Sifan Hassan, who took a little more than a lap to bridge the gap from the back of the pack.  The Kenyan team shared the leading duties, pushing the pace down to 15:32:70.  Gudeta couldn't keep up with the fast pace, eventually dropping out.  The Kenyan efforts kept driving the train until 4 laps to go when World leader Gidey quickly accelerated to the lead.  The Kenyans struggled to keep up, again late to bridge the gap, Hassan went around the Kenyan team to catch Gidey just before the bell.  Running around lapped runners, Hassan extended the gap to win by 3.5 seconds in 30:17.62.  Tirop held on for bronze.

Hassan was running only her second 10,000 ever; her first being her qualifying run at Stanford.  Her only other experience at the distance was a 34:28 road 10K from 2012.  The first 5 were the fastest 5 times of the season.  Excepting Teferi, it was personal bests for the first 8 and 11 total in the race.  42 year old Sinead Diver's personal best turned out to be the W40 Masters World Record.

After setting the world record in the Mile, the 1500 was the primary target for Hassan.  A week later, she completed the double a week later.  Hassan had previously attempted doubles at the Olympics and previous two World Championships, even picking up a bronze medal in the 5000 in 2017.  With a lack of success at 800 metres and the 5000 scheduled on same nights as the 1500, the odd 10,000/1500 double has never previously been accomplished at this level.  Only Paavo Nurmi has gold medals in both events and his were in different Olympiads.

Records
Before the competition, the records were as follows:

Schedule
The event schedule, in local time (UTC+3), was as follows:

Results

Final
The final was started at 21:10.

References

10,000
10,000 metres at the World Athletics Championships